Statistics of Belgian First Division in the 1946–47 season.

Overview

It was contested by 19 teams, and R.S.C. Anderlecht won the championship.

At the end of the season, the number of clubs was reduced from 19 back to 16 for the following season.

League standings

Results

References

Belgian Pro League seasons
1946–47 in Belgian football
Belgian